This is a list of poems by Wilfred Owen.

 "1914"
 "A New Heaven"
 "A Terre"
 "Anthem for Doomed Youth"
 "The Bending over of Clancy Year 12 on October 19th"
 "Arms and the Boy"
 "As Bronze may be much Beautified"
 "Asleep"
 "At a Calvary near the Ancre"
 "Beauty"
 "But I was Looking at the Permanent Stars"
 "Conscious"
 "Cramped in that Funny Hole"
 "Disabled"
 "Dulce et Decorum Est"
 "Elegy in April and September"
 "Exposure"
 "Futility"
 "Greater Love"
 "Happiness"
 "Has Your Soul Sipped?"
 "Hospital Barge"
 "I Saw His Round Mouth's Crimson"
 "Insensibility"
 "Inspection"
 "Le Christianisme"
 "Mental Cases"
 "Miners"
 "Music"
 "S. I. W."
 "Schoolmistress"
 "Six O'Clock in Princes Street"
 "Smile, Smile, Smile"
 Soldier's Dream
 "Sonnet On Seeing a Piece of our Heavy Artillery Brought into Action"
 "Spells and Incantations"
 "Spring Offensive"
 "Strange Meeting"
 "The Calls"
 "The Chances"
 "The Dead-Beat"
 "The End"
 "The Kind Ghosts"
 "The Last Laugh"
 "The Letter"
 "The Next War"
 "The Parable of the Old Man and the Young"
 "The Roads Also"
 "The Send-off"
 "The Sentry"
 "The Show"
 "The Wrestlers"
 "Training"
 "Uriconium An Ode"
 "Wild With All Regrets"
 "With an Identity Disc"
 "How to Smile"

Owen, Wilfred